Statistics of Swedish football Division 3 for the 1968 season.

League standings

Norra Norrland, Övre 1968

Norra Norrland, Nedre 1968

Södra Norrland, Övre 1968

Södra Norrland, Nedre 1968

Norra Svealand 1968

Östra Svealand 1968

Västra Svealand 1968

Nordöstra Götaland 1968

Nordvästra Götaland 1968

Mellersta Götaland 1968

Sydöstra Götaland 1968

Sydvästra Götaland 1968

Skåne 1968

Footnotes

References 

Swedish Football Division 3 seasons
3
Swed
Swed